The 2020–21 Coppa Italia (branded as the TIMVISION Cup for sponsorship reasons during the final) was the 74th edition of the national cup in Italian football.

Napoli were the defending champions, but were defeated by Atalanta in the semi-finals.

Juventus won a record fourteenth title, defeating Atalanta 2–1 in the final.

This season is the last one with the 78-teams format. From the next season, the format would be with 44 teams.

Participating teams

Serie A

Juventus (round of 16)
Internazionale (round of 16)
Atalanta (round of 16)
Lazio (round of 16)
Roma (round of 16)
Milan (round of 16)
Napoli (round of 16)
Sassuolo (round of 16)
Hellas Verona
Fiorentina 
Parma 
Bologna
Udinese
Cagliari
Sampdoria
Torino 
Genoa 
Benevento
Crotone
Spezia

Serie B

Brescia
SPAL
Monza
Vicenza
Reggina
Reggiana
Cremonese
Virtus Entella
Ascoli
Cosenza
Pisa
Pescara
Salernitana
Venezia
Lecce
Empoli 
Frosinone
Cittadella
Chievo
Pordenone

Serie C

Group A
Carrarese
Renate
Pontedera
Alessandria
Novara
Albinoleffe
Arezzo
Pro Patria
Livorno

Group B
Padova
Feralpisalò
Modena
Piacenza
Triestina
Südtirol
Carpi
Sambenedettese
Perugia

Group C
Bari
Virtus Francavilla
Teramo
Catanzaro
Catania
Ternana
Potenza
Monopoli
Avellino
Trapani
Juve Stabia

Serie D

Tritium
Ambrosiana
Breno
San Nicolò Notaresco
Pineto
Trastevere
Latte Dolce
Casarano
Gelbison

Format and seeding
Teams entered the competition at various stages, as follows:
 First phase (one-legged fixtures)
 First round: 27 teams from Serie C and the nine Serie D teams started the tournament
 Second round: the 18 winners from the previous round were joined by the 20 Serie B teams and 2 teams from Serie C
 Third round: the 20 winners from the second round met the 12 Serie A sides, seeded 9–20
 Fourth round: the 16 winners faced each other
 Second phase
 Round of 16 (one-legged): the 8 fourth round winners were inserted into a bracket with the Serie A clubs, seeded 1–8
 Quarter-finals (one-legged)
 Semi-finals (two-legged)
 Final (one-legged)

Round dates
The schedule of each round was the following.

First stage

First round
A total of 36 teams from Serie C and Serie D competed in this round, eighteen of which advanced to the second round.

Second round
A total of forty teams (eighteen winners from the first round, two from Serie C, and all twenty from Serie B) competed in the second round, twenty of which advanced to the third round.

Third round
A total of 32 teams (twenty winners from the second round and twelve Serie A clubs seeded 9–20) competed in the third round, sixteen of which advanced to the fourth round.

Fourth round
The sixteen winners from the third round competed in the fourth round, eight of which advanced to the round of 16.

Final stage

Bracket

Round of 16
The round of 16 matches were played between the eight winners from the fourth round and clubs seeded 1–8 in 2019–20 Serie A, and held from 12 to 21 January. A draw (held on 27 November) determined the home and away teams in matches involving two Serie A sides.

Quarter-finals
The quarter-final matches were played between clubs advancing from the round of 16, and held from 26 to 28 January. A draw (held on 27 November) determined the home and away teams in matches involving two Serie A sides.

Semi-finals
The semi-finals (a two-legged round) were played between clubs advancing from the quarter-finals, and held from 2 to 10 February 2021.

First leg

Second leg

Final

Top goalscorers

Notes

References

Coppa Italia seasons
Coppa Italia
Italy